Pixie Lott is the third studio album by English singer Pixie Lott. It was released on 1 August 2014 by Virgin EMI Records. Lott began recording the album in mid-2012, citing Motown as an influence on the album. "Nasty" was released as the album's lead single on 7 March 2014. The second single, "Lay Me Down", was released on 25 July 2014.

Background
In June 2012, Lott revealed plans to record a Motown-influenced album. "I'm going to be heading to New York to work with the guys who did the original Motown records in the sixties to make a new album soon", Lott told the Daily Star. The album was primarily recorded in London and New York City, as well as in Miami.

The album was finished by June 2013, when Lott stated that she hoped to release the first single in October, and the album would follow in 2014. During a Google+ Hangout on 2 December 2013, Lott announced that her third album would be titled Pixie Lott, along with the accompanying artwork. She explained to Billboard that the album would be self-titled because this one "represents me the most out of all of my albums", adding, "My last album had some dance tracks and some soul tracks, but this one is more centered."

Promotion and singles
In November 2013, Lott unveiled a preview of the music video for the single "Nasty". In early December, it was confirmed that "Nasty", which was originally recorded by Christina Aguilera as a duet with CeeLo Green for the 2010 film Burlesque, would serve as the album's lead single. Released on 7 March 2014, the single reached number nine on the UK Singles Chart and number 43 on the Irish Singles Chart.

A music video for the song "Heart Cry" was filmed in Paris and premiered on 17 December 2013. On 21 July 2014, the track was released as a free download through Amazon.co.uk for a limited time.

"Lay Me Down" was released on 25 July 2014 as the second single from the album. The song peaked at number 114 on the UK Singles Chart.

"Break Up Song" was set to be released as the album's third single, but it was ultimately cancelled. The music video was directed by Nick Bartlett and premiered on 19 September 2014. The video was filmed at The Waldorf Hilton Hotel London and co-stars Lott's boyfriend, model Oliver Cheshire.

Critical reception

Pixie Lott received mixed reviews from contemporary music critics. Stephen Thomas Erlewine of AllMusic wrote that although the album "does attempt to tone down her girlishness", Lott "can't run away from her ebullient instincts, and that sprightliness is why Pixie Lott is an enjoyable piece of high gloss pop." John Walshe of Hot Press commented that Lott "succeeds in unleashing her inner diva throughout these highly polished R&B-tinged pop standards, complete with backing vocals that could have been lifted from the golden era of soul music itself." David Smyth of the London Evening Standard noted that the album trades "the electronic pop touches of its predecessor" for "a more organic sound that comes across like a lightweight Amy Winehouse", while complimenting the songs "Break Up Song", "Bang" and "Kill a Man". However, Smyth concluded that "Lott sings with a lot of bravura but surprisingly little soul."

Martin Townsend of the Daily Express was complimentary of opening song "Nasty", but criticised the rest of the album as "standard, crescendoing modern r'n'b distinguished only by Lott's rather unattractive nasal warble." Matthew Horton of Virgin Media opined that the album "suggests Pixie Lott [...] is a genuine retro-soul diva, comfortable with the grandstanding ballads and the slinky R&B stompers", but felt that "[t]he risk with these retro tools is slipping into pastiche". Despite stating that tracks like "Leaving You" and "Cry and Smile" "best showcase [Lott's] smoky vocals", the Irish Independent characterised the album as "a middle ground of Bruno Mars and edgeless Winehouse", expressing that its "main issue" is that "almost everything about it is second-hand." Will Hodgkinson of The Times commented that "[y]ou can't get away from the feeling that [Lott] is imitating a soul singer rather than actually being one", adding that "while you can see the record company-led logic of Lott moving away from pure pop and heading towards classic soul, it's a misguided and unconvincing new look." Killian Fox of The Observer wrote, "The execution is proficient enough, but everything about the album lacks character, from the anodyne production to the wafer-thin songs, which reveal what they're all about within the first verse."

Commercial performance
Pixie Lott debuted at number 15 on the UK Albums Chart, selling 3,895 copies in its first week. The following week, the album fell to number 94 with 934 copies sold.

Track listing

Notes
  signifies a vocal producer
  signifies an additional producer
  signifies an original producer

Sample credits
 "Nasty" features song adaptations of "Dance Across the Floor" written Harry Casey and Richard Finch, "Do It ('Til You're Satisfied)" written by Billy Nichols, and "Funky President (People It's Bad)" written by James Brown.

Personnel
Credits adapted from the liner notes of the Japanese edition of Pixie Lott.

 Pixie Lott – vocals ; backing vocals 
 Jerry Abbott – vocal production ; vocal recording ; percussion ; bass ; additional keyboards ; additional production ; guitar ; additional engineering ; engineering ; production ; programming ; recording ; mixing ; keyboards ; handclaps 
 Rami Afuni – production 
 Connor Ball – bass, vocals 
 Nick Barr – viola 
 Ian Burdge – cello 
 Simon Clarke – saxophone 
 Craze & Hoax – original production 
 Tim Debney – mastering engineering 
 Alison Dods – violin 
 Dreamlab – production 
 Michael Duke – additional vocals 
 Coco Dupree – backing vocals 
 Jake Edwards-Wood – Hammond organ, piano 
 Benjamin Epstein – bass 
 Tristan Evans – drums, vocals 
 Ben 'Jah' Fairman – voice of boxing commentator 
 Jon Green – backing vocals, bass guitar, production ; guitar, keyboards ; piano ; Hammond organ 
 Searah Hall – backing vocals 
 Mads Hauge – backing vocals, production 
 Stuart Hawkes – mastering engineering 
 Sally Herbert – string arrangement ; violin ; string session 
 Emily Holligan – backing vocals 
 Kick Horns – horns 
 Jim Irvin – percussion ; additional programming 
 Andrew Jackson – backing vocals 
 Oli Langford – violin 
 Dave Liddell – trombone 
 Joshua McKenzie – drums ; additional drums 
 James McVey – guitar, vocals 
 Elisabeth Melton – backing vocals 
 Grace Mitchell – backing vocals 
 George Murphy – recording engineering ; percussion ; bass, Hammond and horn engineering and recording 
 Andrew Murray – string arrangement, string programming ; Wurlitzer ; piano ; Hammond organ 
 Michael James Onufrak – string arrangement 
 Adam Pallin – engineering, production, programming 
 Matt Parad – whistles 
 Ashton Parsons – backing vocals 
 Ryan Quigley – trumpet 
 Jay Reynolds – mixing ; additional drum programming ; additional drums, programming ; keyboards, production 
 Kate Robinson – violin 
 Tim Sanders – tenor saxophone 
 Bradley Simpson – guitar, vocals 
 Jack Splash – arrangement, drums, engineering, keyboards, percussion, production, programming 
 Paul Spong – trumpet 
 Mark 'Spike' Stent – mixing 
 Phil Thornalley – backing vocals, electric sitar, guitar, drums, percussion, production, programming 
 David Tozer – mixing 
 Jeremy Wheatley – mixing 
 Lucy Wilkins – violin 
 Christian Wright – mastering engineering

Charts

Release history

References

2014 albums
Albums produced by Jack Splash
Pixie Lott albums
Virgin EMI Records albums